Hsu Te-hsiang is a Taiwanese politician. He served on the Sixth Legislative Yuan from 2006 to 2008, succeeding Lin Cho-shui, who had resigned.

Hsu has led several fishing associations.

References

Year of birth missing (living people)
Living people
Members of the 6th Legislative Yuan
Democratic Progressive Party Members of the Legislative Yuan
Party List Members of the Legislative Yuan